Hoseynabad (also Romanized as Ḩoseynābād, Husainābād, and Khusainabad; also known as Ḩoseynābād-e Bozorg) is a village in Ilat-e Qaqazan-e Sharqi Rural District, Kuhin District, Qazvin County, Qazvin Province, Iran. At the 2006 census, its population was 944, in 241 families. This village is populated by Azerbaijani Turks.

References 

Populated places in Qazvin County